Hans Berndt (30 October 1913 – 9 April 1988) was a German footballer who played for Tennis Borussia Berlin and VfB Königsberg. He was also capped three times for the German national team, scoring two goals.

References

External links 
 

1913 births
1988 deaths
Footballers from Berlin
German footballers
Germany international footballers
Association football forwards
Tennis Borussia Berlin players
People from Spandau
SC Staaken players